Second Republic is a campaign group for political reform in Ireland. The group was founded in 2010 and lobbied for the establishment of the Irish Constitutional Convention.

The group advocates the introduction of citizen-initiated referendums in Ireland, votes for the Irish diaspora, and participates in the Open Government Partnership. In 2015, the group made a submission to the working group on Seanad reform that comprised a public consultation of over 1,200 people.

In 2013, the group's founding member was shortlisted for a Volunteer of the Year Award for work done by Second Republic in building citizenship and campaigning for reform.

References

External links
 

Political organisations based in the Republic of Ireland
Reform in the Republic of Ireland